Atilla Iskif is a Turkish champion Flair Bartender Mixologist . He has won laurels on the international stage in various countries.
He was 4 times winner of the European Flair Champion and World No 2 title, He uses his experience and knowledge to train bartenders across the globe, having trained around 800 bartenders in 15 countries.

Celebrity performances 
Iskifoglu has performed flair bartending for Sting, John Travolta, Madonna, Darius, Simon Cowell and Piers Morgan.
Sting - Jodhpur "indian head injury foundation" Sting concert after party" 2013
Simon Cowell - Britains Got Talent - London -2009
Piers Morgan - Britains Got Talent - 2009
Amanda Holden - Britains Got Talent - London 2009
John Travolta  - Super Bowl - Miami 2007
Sugar babes, Lemar, Darius, Lulu  - Orbit Bar - 2000/2006

Media and interviews 
Behind Bars
In full spirits
Flair for fun
The art of responsible bartending
Incredible Flair
Liquid Mag
Balanced Bartender
Bloomberg TV "Known for a skills in mixology and flair bartending Atilla Iskifoglu is in India." TV coverage on YouTube from 5:30 minutes.
BBC London Drink journalist Nigel Barden talking about Atilla Iskifoglu
ITV LondonBritain's got talent series 3 live on TV

International awards 

Performed on Britain's got talent

References

Bartenders
Britain's Got Talent contestants
Jugglers
Living people
1985 births